Agnippe echinulata is a moth of the family Gelechiidae. It is found in China (Shaanxi, Shanxi).

The wingspan is 8–9 mm. The forewings have a black basal patch and two black subtriangular spots fused near the costal margin. The posterior half of the forewings is white. The hindwings are light grey. Adults are on wing from the end of June to August.

References

Moths described in 1993
Agnippe
Moths of Asia